Hubert Turski (born 31 January 2003) is a Polish professional footballer who plays as a forward for Pogoń Szczecin II.

Career statistics

Club

Notes

References

2003 births
Living people
Polish footballers
Poland youth international footballers
Association football forwards
Pogoń Szczecin players
Chrobry Głogów players
Ekstraklasa players
I liga players
III liga players